

F
 FAIX - FAIX Leasing
 FALX - Falk Corporation
 FANU - Brenner Tank, Inc.
 FAPR - Floydada and Plainview Railroad
 FARX - Farmers Cooperative Company (of Cleghorn, Iowa)
 FBAU - Ahlers Lines NV
 FBDC - Ford County Historical Railroad Preservation Foundation
 FBFU - Marine Transworld Equipment Corporation
 FBMU - Cie Maritime Belge, SA
 FBMX - Fayblock Materials
 FBOX - Trailer Train Company, TTX Company
 FBSU - Franco Belgian Services
 FBZU - China Ocean Shipping Company
 FC   - Fulton County Railroad
 FCCM - Compania de Ferrocarriles Chiapas Mayab, SA de CV
 FCCX - Farmers Cooperative Company, Finova Capital Corporation
 FCDN - Ferrocarril de Nacozari
 FCEN - Florida Central Railroad
 FCEX - Farmers Union Central Exchange
 FCIN - Frankfort and Cincinnati Railroad
 FCM  - Ferrocarril Mexicano
 FCP  - Ferrocarril del Pacifico
 FCR  - Fulton County Railway
 FCRD - First Coast Railroad
 FCRK - Falls Creek Railroad
 FCTX - Farmers' Commodities Transportation
 FDDM - Fort Dodge, Des Moines and Southern Railway, Chicago and North Western Railway, Union Pacific Railroad
 FDMA - Ferrocarril de Minatitlan al Carmen
 FDSU - Foodsource, Inc.
 FDSZ - Foodsource, Inc.
 FEC  - Florida East Coast Railway
 FECU - Yamashita-Shinnihon Line
 FECZ - Florida East Coast Railway
 FEIX - Farmers Elevator, Inc.
 FEMX - Freight Equipment Management Company
 FEPX - FirstEnergy Corp
 FEXZ - Florida Express Carriers, Inc.
 FFEZ - Frozen Food Express
 FFFZ - Flexi-Van Leasing, Inc.
 FFIX - Procor, Ltd.
 FFTX - Fun Trains, Inc. (operators of the Florida Fun Train)
 FGCX - Florida Gulf Coast Railroad Museum
 FGER - Fruit Growers Express
 FGEX - Fruit Growers Express
 FGGX - Farmers Grain Cooperative
 FGLK - Finger Lakes Railway
 FGLX - Factor Gas Liquids, Inc.
 FGMR - Fruit Growers Express
 FGTX - Florida Gas Terminals, Inc.
 FGWX - Federal Grain Inspection Service (USDA)
 FHRX - Flint Hills Resources
 FILX - Wellman, Inc.
 FIMX - Franklin Industrial Minerals
 FINU - Interpool, Ltd.
 FINX - Trinity Rail Management, Inc.
 FIR  - Flats Industrial Railroad
 FISZ - Ecorail, Inc.
 FJG  - Fonda, Johnstown and Gloversville Railroad
 FJLX - Big West Oil Company
 FL   - Family Lines System
 FLAX - Flexsys America
 FLAZ - Flexi-Van Leasing
 FLCX - Flex Leasing Corporation
 FLDX - DTE Transportation Services, Inc.
 FLEX - RailLease, Inc.
 FLGZ - Flexi-Van Leasing
 FLIX - Farmland Industries, Inc.
 FLJX - Big West Oil Company
 FLNX - R. P. Flynn, Inc., Ohio Railway Supply
 FLOX - Flex Leasing Company
 FLRX - ADM Milling Company
 FLSX - Great Miami, Inc.
 FLT  - Foss Launch and Tug
 FLTZ - Flexi-Van Leasing
 FLXU - Flexi-Van Leasing
 FLXZ - Flexi-Van Leasing
 FMCU - FMC Corporation (Industrial Chemical Group)
 FMGU - Flota Mercante Grancolombiana, SA
 FMID - Florida Midland Railroad
 FMIX - CCKX, Inc.
 FMLX - FMC Corporation (Inorganic Chemicals Division)
 FMOX - FMC Corporation (Inorganic Chemicals Division)
 FMRC - Farmrail Corporation
 FNAX - Ferrellgas LLP
 FNE  - TFM, SA de CV
 FNM  - Ferrocarriles Nacionales de Mexico
 FNOR - Florida Northern Railroad
 FOR  - Fore River Railroad
 FORZ - Flexi-Van Leasing
 FP   - Fordyce and Princeton Railroad
 FPAX - Formosa Plastics Corporation, Formosa Transrail Corporation
 FPBX - Federal Paper Board Company, International Paper Corporation
 FPCX - Occidental Chemical Corporation (PVC resins), Oxy Vinyls LP
 FPN  - Ferrocarriles Nacionales de Mexico
 FPPX - Fayette Power Project
 FPXZ - Flexi-Van Leasing
 FRDN - Ferdinand Railroad, H and S Railroad
 FREU - ABS Industrial Verification, Inc.
 FRLU - Farrell Lines, Inc.
 FRR  - Falls Road Railroad
 FRRX - Feather River Rail Society
 FRSU - China Ocean Shipping Company
 FRTX - Frit Transportation, Inc., Farm-City Transport, Inc.
 FRV  - Fox River Valley Railroad; Wisconsin Central
 FRVR - Fox Valley and Western
 FSCX - Frank Mitacek Railway Service
 FSFL - Burlington Northern and Santa Fe Railway; BNSF Railway
 FSHX - GE Rail Services
 FSIX - FSIX, Inc.
 FSR  - Fort Smith Railroad
 FSRR - Ferrosur
 FST  - Ferrocarriles Nacionales de Mexico
 FSTU - Fastrac Intermodal, LLC
 FSTX - Fuel Supply Trust
 FSTZ - Fastrac Intermodal, LLC
 FSUD - Fort Street Union Depot Company
 FSVB - Fort Smith and Van Buren Railway
 FTCU - Firsttank Corporation
 FTCX - Far Port Cooperative, Inc.
 FTIX - FTIX Associates
 FTMZ - Fruit Growers Express
 FTSX - Fairmont Tamper
 FTTX - Trailer Train Company, TTX Company
 FUCU - Shinko Pantec Company, Ltd.
 FURX - First Union Rail
 FUS  - Ferrocarriles Unidos del Sureste, Ferrocarriles Nacionales de Mexico
 FVIU - Flexi-Van, Inc.
 FVIZ - Flexi-Van Leasing
 FVLZ - Venezuelan Line
 FVPZ - Flexi-Van Leasing
 FVRR - Fredonia Valley Railroad
 FVW  - Fox Valley and Western
 FWAZ - Flexi-Van Leasing
 FWCR - Florida West Coast Railroad
 FWD  - Fort Worth and Denver Railway, Chicago, Burlington and Quincy Railroad, Burlington Northern Railroad, Burlington Northern and Santa Fe Railway
 FWDB - Fort Worth and Dallas Belt Railroad
 FWDR - Fort Worth and Dallas Railroad
 FWIU - Trans Ocean, Ltd.
 FWLX - Foster Wheeler Ltd.
 FWRY - Fillmore and Western Railway
 FWTX - American Railcar Leasing, LLC -  SMBC Rail Services LLC
 FWTZ - Flexi-Van Leasing
 FWU  - Fort Wayne Union
 FWWR - Fort Worth and Western Railroad
 FXE  - Ferromex

References

F